Roots and Wings is the eighth studio album by Canadian country music artist Terri Clark. The album was released on July 26, 2011 via BareTrack Records/Capitol Nashville/EMI Canada. The first single released from the album was "Northern Girl." The album's second single, "We're Here for a Good Time," was originally recorded by Canadian rock band Trooper in 1977.

Roots and Wings won Country Album of the Year at the 2012 Juno Awards.

Track listing

Personnel

 John Barry – electric guitar
 Terri Clark – choir, lead vocals, background vocals
 John Diamond – bass guitar
 Dan Dugmore – steel guitar
 Stuart Duncan – fiddle
 Jeneé Fleenor – background vocals
 Shannon Forrest – drums
 Kenny Greenberg – electric guitar
 Kristen Hall – choir, background vocals
 Tony Harrell – accordion, piano
 Edie Hartwick – choir
 Wes Hightower – background vocals
 Sonya Isaacs – background vocals
 Jeff Jones – choir

 Alison Krauss – background vocals on "Smile"
 B. James Lowry – acoustic guitar
 Tim Marks – bass guitar
 Brent Mason – electric guitar
 Lyle Molzan – drums
 Jourdan Murr – choir
 Steve Nathan – keyboards
 Russ Pahl – steel guitar
 John Wesley Ryles – background vocals
 Bryan Sutton – banjo, acoustic guitar, mandolin
 Glenn Worf – bass guitar
 Andrea Zonn – fiddle

Release history

Chart performance
Album

Singles

References

2011 albums
Terri Clark albums
Capitol Records albums
Juno Award for Country Album of the Year albums